Knutsford Little Theatre is an amateur theatre group based in Knutsford, United Kingdom. They were formed in 1925, as Knutsford Amateur Drama Society and changed their name, after acquiring their own premises on Queen Street. They perform up to seven productions a year including a very popular family pantomime and a youth production.

The society is run by its members who are entitled to vote at the annual award ceremony held as part of the AGM. The Society is part of the Cheshire Theatre Guild. and the National Operatic and Dramatic Association.

History 
The society was formed after a meeting in the Cranford Cafe on a date in March 1925 when a group of local residents met to discuss the formation of Knutsford Amateur Dramatic Society. There had been theatrical productions in Knutsford for a number of years prior to the meeting: the Y.M.C.A. had performed Thread of Scarlett, a play about a murder in Ashley that resulted in execution at Knutsford Prison, and the Young Liberals had also got in on the act with a performance of Between the Soup and the Savoury by Gertrude Jennings. There was clearly an appetite for theatre in the town and it seems that Mr H. T. Whitney, who was a dentist on Tatton Street and a member of Wilmslow Green Room Society, was a prime mover in getting KADS off the ground.

One of the first tasks of the newly formed committee seems to have been the creation of a concert party. One member, Miss Grice, was a pianist and her father Joseph first violin. A small orchestra was formed and music rehearsals took place in Mr Grice's garage and cycle shop on Princess Street. Rehearsals for the plays, however, were held in Kings Coffee House and performances were first at the Y.M.C.A., then at the Town Hall before moving to the Marcliff Cinema, on the site where the civic hall now stands. It was here that the society held some of its most spectacular early productions. The Knutsford Guardian reports fine performances in When We Are Married and The Shop at Sly Corner, whilst special praise is given to the scenery for The Importance of Being Ernest and We Must Kill Toni had genuine stained glass windows.

The Queen Street building now known to all as the Little Theatre was originally St Vincent's Roman Catholic School. The school, which opened in August 1888, was built under the supervision of Father Robert Maurice and had accommodated eighty children between the ages of three and fifteen years. When KADS mounted their first production there the stage was thirteen feet square with a narrow extension at the front that had been built by United States forces out of ammunition boxes. It was lit by a single bulb in each front corner. The stage crew rebuilt the stage to the full width of the auditorium but were still limited to twelve feet due to a Chancel Arch bang in the middle. The audience sat on school benches that they shuffled along until the person at the far end fell off!

Over the next few years KADS set about transforming their new theatre. A trap door was built to take advantage of the first floor and in 1950 a surplus pavilion from Mobberly Cricket Club was transported to Queen Street to form dressing rooms and a workshop. During the 1960s indoor toilets, proper seating and central heating was installed. The society continue to invest in the property and the auditorium and bar are now fitted to a very high standard. Photographs of productions and poster designs can be viewed on the theatre website and The National Archives hold a programme from the 1971 - 72 season.

Recent Productions 
Productions since January 2000 in reverse chronological order.

Robin Hood - January 2020
Grease - July 2019
Teechers - November 2019
Cinderella - January 2019
A Bunch of Amateurs - June 2018
Bugsy Malone - July 2017
The Thrill of Love - April 2017
Ali Baba and Some Thieves - January 2017
Life Begins Again - November 2016
Dazzle (A Summer Funfair Musical) - July 2016
Unleashed - April 2016
Snow White and the Seven Dwarves - January 2016
Treasure Island - November 2015
Be My Baby - September 2015
Good Things - June 2015
The Importance of Being Earnest - April 2015
Just The Ticket - February 2015
Aladdin - January 2015
The Hound of the Baskervilles - November 2014
My Boy Jack – September 2014
Dazzle – A Musical Space–tacular – July 2014
Natural Causes – May 2014
Deathtrap – March 2014
The Sleeping Beauty – January 2014
The Flint Street Nativity – November 2013
A Piece of Cake – September 2013
Bouncers – June 2013
Roleplay – March 2013
Billy Bun and the Four Wishes – January 2013
Player's Angels – September 2012
Bugsy Malone – July 2012
Bolt From The Blue – June 2012
Ladies Day – March 2012
Red Riding Hood – January 2012
Gaslight – November 2011
Lucky Sods – August 2011
There Goes The Bride – June 2011
The Knutsford Little Theatre International One Act Play Festival – April 2011
The 39 Steps (play) – March 2011
Cinderella – January 2011
The Murder Room – November 2010
Men of the World – September 2010
Tin Pan Ali – July 2010
Good Grief – June 2010
Life Begins at Seventy – April 2010
Killing Time – March 2010
Dick Whittington – January 2010
Mr Wonderful – November 2009
London Suite – September 2009
The Rocky Monster Show – July 2009
Absurd Person Singular – June 2009
Proscenophobia – March 2009
The Snow Queen – January 2009
Sufficient Carbohydrate – November 2008
The Knutsford Little Theatre International Short Play Festival – October 2008
The End of the Food Chain – September 2008
Olivia – July 2008
Wanted: One Body – June 2008
The Odd Couple (Female) – April 2008
Jack And The Beanstalk – January 2008
Abigail's Party – November 2007
They Came From Mars...Farndale – September 2007
Shake, Ripple & Roll – July 2007
Neville's Island – June 2007
Blithe Spirit – April 2007
Confusions – March 2007
Snow White – January 2007
Sleuth – November 2006
Return to the Forbidden Planet – September 2006
Skool & Crossbones – July 2006
Salt of the Earth – June 2006
Murder By the Book – April 2006
Bazaar and Rummage – March 2006
Aladdin – January 2006
One For The Road – November 2005
Who's On First – September 2005
Helen Come Home – July 2005
Unleashed – June 2005
An Inspector Calls – April 2005
The Kingfisher – March 2005
Hickory Dickory Dock – January 2005
Stop The World I Want To Get Off – November 2004
On Monday Next – September 2004
Bouncers & Shakers – August 2004
Worzel Gummidge – July 2004
My Mother Said I Never Should – May 2004
Bouncers – April 2004
Rattle Of A Simple Man – February 2004
Sing a Song of Sixpence – January 2004
Murder in the Alps – November 2003
The Old Country – September 2003
Drucula Spectacular – July 2003
The Killing of Sister George – June 2003
Cinderella – January 2003
Shakers Re-stirred – August 2002
Bugsy Malone – July 2002
Charley's Aunt – June 2002
Our Day Out – April 2002
Educating Rita – March 2002
Sleeping Beauty – January 2002
Loot – October 2001
Three One Act Plays – September 2001
Shake, Ripple & Roll – July 2001
Chase Me Up Farndale Avenue, S'il Vous Plait – April 2001
Rough Justice – March 2001
The Snow Queen – January 2001
The Chiltern Hundreds – October 2000
Dazzle – July 2000
Big Bad Mouse – May 2000
The Diary of Anne Frank – March 2000
Dick Whittington And His Cat – January 2000

References

External links 
 Knutsford Little Theatre
 St Vincent's RC Primary School

Amateur theatre companies in England
Theatres in Cheshire
Knutsford